Auguste Wilbrandt-Baudius (1 June 1843, Zwickau – 30 March 1937, Vienna) was a German-Austrian actress, writer and journalist. She is considered one of the most popular actresses of her time in Vienna, especially for female and mother roles.

Early life 
Auguste Baudius was born on 1 June 1843 in Zwickau, Saxony. Baudius received her first artistic lessons from her adoptive father, an actor Karl Friedrich Baudius. Her mother's maiden name was Kriessich.

Career 
Baudius made her debut at the Stadttheater in Leipzig, Saxony in 1857. She received an engagement in Breslau and was hired by Heinrich Laube to Hof-Burgtheater (later Burgtheater) in Vienna in 1861 where she played until 1878. She preferred to perform in plays by Adolf von Wilbrandt.

In 1873, Baudius married a writer and director of the Vienna Burgtheater Adolf von Wilbrandt in Vienna. In 1875, Wilbrandt-Baudius gave birth to their son Robert Wilbrandt who became an economist.

In 1878, she left the Burgtheater. She spent some time in Paris before moving to Vienna in 1889 where she worked at the Theater an der Wien and later the Deutsches Theater in Berlin, the Hoftheater in Meiningen and from 1893 at the Raimundtheater in Vienna. In 1898, Wilbrandt-Baudius returned to Vienna Burgtheather as an actress and performed there until her death.

Wilbrandt-Baudius was also active as a journalist and published in "Pester Lloyd" in Budapest. She also wrote feature articles for the “Neue Freie Presse” and the “Neue Wiener Tagblatt” in Vienna.

Auguste Wilbrandt-Baudius died in Vienna on March 30, 1937 at the age of almost 94 and found her final resting place in Vienna Central Cemetery. Her grave of honor was donated by the City of Vienna is in group 32 C, number 13.

Roles (selection) 

 Juliet - Romeo and Juliet by William Shakespeare
 Annaliese - The Anna-Liese by Hermann Hersch
 Klärchen - Egmont by Johann Wolfgang von Goethe 
 Gretchen - Faust by Johann Wolfgang von Goethe
 Käthchen - Das Käthchen von Heilbronn by Heinrich von Kleist
 Luise - Intrigue and Love by Friedrich Schiller
 Mirandolina - Mirandolina by Carlo Goldoni 
 The Queen - The Glass of Water by Eugène Scribe
 Bianca - The Taming of the Shrew by William Shakespeare
 Polish Countess - The Clemenceau Affair by Alexandre Dumas the Younger
 Hermance - Child of Happiness by Charlotte Birch-Pfeiffer
 Karoline - I'm staying single! by Carl Blum

References 

1843 births
1937 deaths
German stage actresses
19th-century German actresses
19th-century Austrian actresses
Austrian women journalists
German women journalists